Semlin  is a village in the administrative district of Gmina Zblewo, within Starogard County, Pomeranian Voivodeship, in northern Poland. It is located within the ethnocultural region of Kociewie in the historic region of Pomerania.

The village has a population of 466.

Semlin was a royal village of the Polish Crown, administratively located in the Tczew County in the Pomeranian Voivodeship.

References

Semlin